Roger Rouge (born 1 June 1914, date of death unknown) was a Swiss sailor. He competed in the 5.5 Metre event at the 1964 Summer Olympics.

References

External links
 

1914 births
Year of death missing
Swiss male sailors (sport)
Olympic sailors of Switzerland
Sailors at the 1964 Summer Olympics – 5.5 Metre
Place of birth missing